There are many roads and bridges named after Rev. Dr. Martin Luther King Jr.

The Martin Luther King Bridge can refer to:
Martin Luther King Bridge (St. Louis), over the Mississippi River
Martin Luther King Jr. Memorial Bridge, in Petersburg, Virginia
Martin Luther King Bridge (Port Arthur, Texas)
Martin Luther King Bridge (Toledo, Ohio), over the Maumee River